Alrestatin is an inhibitor of aldose reductase, an enzyme involved in the pathogenesis of complications of diabetes mellitus, including diabetic neuropathy.

Alrestat was first synthesized in 1969 and was the first aldose reductase inhibitor (ARI) with oral bioavailability to undergo clinical trials, in the late 1970s and early 1980s. Low-quality trials and a high incidence of adverse effects (particularly hepatotoxicity) led to termination of its development, and it was never in clinical use. It is structurally related to tolrestat, another ARI that was briefly marketed before being withdrawn in 1997.

Synthesis

See also
Amonafide
 Scriptaid

References

Anti-diabetic drugs
Imides
Carboxylic acids